My Brother Sam Is Dead is a 1974 young-adult historical fiction novel by James Lincoln Collier and Christopher Collier. The book takes place in Redding, Connecticut during the American Revolution, and is told from the perspective of a young boy, Tim Meeker. The novel details Tim's brother, Sam, and his desire to fight for the Patriots, despite his father's opposition to the war. Ultimately, Tim is forced to decide between siding with his brother and joining the colonies’ war efforts, or abiding by his father's anti-war wishes.

The novel received various book awards and nominations from the National Book Foundation and American Library Association, but was later ranked in ALA's "Most Frequently Challenged Books" and "Banned/Challenged Books" from 1990 to 2000 and 2000 to 2009. During this time period, the novel was subject to much controversy surrounding its use in elementary school classrooms, given several counts of violence and profanity throughout the book.

Plot 
Narrated by 12-year-old boy Tim (Timmy) Meeker, the story begins at the start of the Revolutionary War (1775-1783) in the Loyalist town of Redding, Connecticut. Timmy's father is a local tavern owner who immediately expresses his discontent with the war. As a pacifist, Mr. Meeker feels withdrawn from the political affairs taking place among Tories and Patriots, and he urges his sons to not get involved, as he believes war only results in death.  Despite this, Timmy's 16-year-old brother, Sam, shares with Timmy that he will be enlisting in the war to fight for the Patriots under General Benedict Arnold. Timmy understands much of his brother's contention with the British Tory party, feeling as though England arbitrarily regulates the colonies from overseas.

Upon hearing that Sam has enlisted to fight against the British and catching him trying to steal the family rifle, Brown Bess, Mr. Meeker throws Sam out of the house, leaving Timmy conflicted with the decision to remain uninvolved or follow in his brother's footsteps.  As the war continues to erupt throughout the colonies Tim joins his father in traveling to Verplanck's Point, a common place for the Meekers to sell cattle and goods. Despite multiple warnings to avoid selling goods to Tories, Tim and his father are caught doing so. Ultimately, Mr. Meeker is captured by Patriots and mistakenly taken as a British prisoner of war, where he later dies of cholera.

The Rebels begin traveling throughout New England to loot towns for food, goods, and weaponry, and upon arriving in Redding, Tim follows the Rebels to revisit his brother after almost two years without seeing one another. Shortly after, the brothers’ family cattle fall victim to theft, and although Tim was able to retrieve all the cows but one, Sam is accused of stealing by another Rebel and is executed. Tim quickly grows infuriated with the Patriots for their responsibility for his brother's and father's deaths, despite his initial alignment with the Patriots against British colonialism. The novel concludes with both Tim and his mother, Susanna, relocating to Pennsylvania at the war's end, and later, Tim getting married and opening a tavern of his own to honor his father.

Reception
My Brother Sam is Dead is a Newbery Honor book that was also named an ALA Notable Children's Book and nominated for a National Book Award in 1975. The ALA reports that My Brother Sam is Dead was the twelfth most frequently challenged book in the period from 1990 to 2000, and the 27th most challenged book from 2000 to 2009.

According to authors Nicholas J. Karolides, Margaret. Bald, and Dawn B. Sova, the widespread controversy surrounding My Brother Sam is Dead followed the novel's popular usage in elementary school curriculums in the late 1980s. The novel was commonly used in 5th to 7th-grade history classes as part of Revolutionary War studies. However, the book's usage received backlash from many students, teachers, and educators who deemed the novel's vivid descriptions of violence and use of profane language as highly inappropriate for children and called upon school boards to ban the book and seek alternative novels. Despite much opposition, several educators have defended the book's usage in schools. In March 2000 in Springfield, Oregon, Jerry and Kelly Dunn lobbied to get “My Brother Sam is Dead” removed from the districts’ public schools after discovering the novel was read in their daughter's fifth-grade classroom. Roma Roderick, the teacher who assigned the book, argues that the novel provides “an honest, hard-hitting look at war.” Roderick explains that the novel's profanity does not concern her as an elementary school educator, as long as she teaches her students that violence and swearing, despite being discussed in the novel, are not condoned.

Challenges (1996-2000)

April 1996 
In the Jefferson County Public Schools (Colorado), Marcia Super filed a challenge to My Brother Sam is Dead after discovering that the novel was being taught in her granddaughter's fifth grade classroom. Super cited twenty-five counts of profane language.

September 1996 
At Antioch Elementary School (California), Judy Nelson filed several complaints surrounding the use of My Brother Sam is Dead in her son's fifth-grade social studies class. Nelson's discomfort stemmed from the book's profane language and descriptions of violence. As a result,  the Antioch School Board ordered skipping over the novel's graphic content when read aloud in the classroom.

March 1998 
At McSwain Elementary School (Virginia), two parents, Linda Bailey and Beverly Dudley expressed their concerns about the use of profanity and graphic descriptions of violent war stories that take place within the novel. The book was being taught in their child's fifth-grade classroom where they felt that it was both inappropriate to be taught at such a young age and should be removed from the curriculum.

December 1998 
My Brother Sam is Dead was removed from use in fifth-grade classrooms in the Hampton County (Virginia) schools. Two parents, Michael Harries and Richard Antcliff noted the novel's inclusion of profane language like “‘damn,’ bastard,’ and ‘hell,” and urged that the book be immediately removed from the elementary curriculum.

November 1999  
In Oak Brook Elementary School (Illinois), parents expressed concerns regarding the novel's foul language and violent content. Debby Stangaroni, the parent to a sixth-grade student at the school, voiced specific concerns claiming that her child was left “disturbed” after reading the book in class.

June 2000 
In the Southern Columbia school district (Pennsylvania), school officials voted to black out words like “‘dammit,’ ‘damn you,’ and ‘bastard,’” after a parent objected to the use of what was perceived as inappropriate phrases. Curriculum Director in the district, Roy Clippinger, shared that “the swear words really added nothing to the book and really took nothing away from it,” prompting the ultimate decision to keep the book in use while also filtering its language.

Legacy
The song 'Sam (Is Dead)' by Odd Future members Tyler, The Creator and Domo Genesis is titled after the novel.

Notes

External links
Sparknotes on the Novel

1974 American novels
Novels set during the American Revolutionary War
Children's historical novels
Novels set in Connecticut
Newbery Honor-winning works
American young adult novels
Redding, Connecticut
1974 children's books